"You Really Had Me Going" is a song co-written and recorded by American country music artist Holly Dunn.  It was released in September 1990 as the first single from the album Heart Full of Love.  The song was Dunn's second and final number one on the country chart.  The single went to number one for one week and spent a total of 20 weeks on the country chart.  The song was written by Dunn, Tom Shapiro and Chris Waters.

Chart performance

Year-end charts

References

1990 singles
Holly Dunn songs
Songs written by Tom Shapiro
Songs written by Chris Waters
Songs written by Holly Dunn
Warner Records singles
1990 songs